The Beach 44th Street station (signed as Beach 44th Street–Frank Avenue station) is a station on the IND Rockaway Line of the New York City Subway. It is served by the A train at all times.

History

Beach 44th Street–Frank Avenue was originally a trolley stop of the Ocean Electric Railway, which used a former segment of the Long Island Rail Road's Far Rockaway Branch tracks, until it became a Long Island Railroad Station in 1922. The station was relocated 758 feet east of its former location between August 2 and August 23, 1940 as part of a grade crossing elimination project between Beach 44th Street and Beach 47th Street. The new elevated station was opened on April 10, 1942.

The station was purchased by New York City on October 3, 1955, along with the rest of the Rockaway Beach Branch and Far Rockaway Branch west of Far Rockaway, after a fire on the line's crossing over Jamaica Bay in 1950. Now operated by the New York City Transit Authority, it reopened as a subway station along the IND Rockaway Line on June 28, 1956.

Station layout

There are two tracks and two side platforms.

Exits
This station has no closed exits, and the full-time fare control is at the middle of the platforms. Four stairs lead to the street, two on each western corner of Rockaway Freeway and Beach 44th Street.

References

External links 

 
 Station Reporter — A Rockaway
 Frank Avenue Station, 1955 (Arrt's Arrchives)
 The Subway Nut — Beach 44th Street-Frank Avenue Pictures 
 Beach 44th Street entrance from Google Maps Street View
 Platforms from Google Maps Street View

IND Rockaway Line stations
Rockaway, Queens
New York City Subway stations in Queens, New York
Railway stations in the United States opened in 1956
1956 establishments in New York City
Railway stations in the United States opened in 1922
1922 establishments in New York City